The Unified State Exam (Yediniy gosudarstvenniy ekzamen, EGE) is an exam in the Russian Federation. It is a series of exams every student must pass after graduation from high school to enter a university or a professional college. Since 2009, the USE is the only form of graduation examination in schools and the main form of preliminary examinations in universities. A student can take a USE in the Russian language, mathematics, foreign languages (English, German, French, Spanish, Chinese), physics, chemistry, biology, geography, literature, history, basics of social sciences, and computing science.  The USE in the Russian language and mathematics are obligatory; that means that every student needs to get the necessary results in these subjects to enter any Russian university or get a high school diploma.

History   
The USE was introduced in Russia in 2001 first as an educational experiment, initially held in a few regions of Russia: Chuvashia, Mari El, Yakutia, as well as in Samara, and Rostov Oblasts. The first experimental examination was only held by the eight general classes. In 2002 this experiment was continued in 16 regions of Russia, and expanded to 47 regions in 2003, then in 2006 about 950 thousand school graduates took the test all over Russia. In 2008 that number rose to more than one million graduates. The list of schools and classes to take part in the USE in 2001–2008 was determined by local public education authorities in the regions of Russia. 

Presently, the USE is administered by the Ministry of Education and Science together with the regional and local public education authorities.

Structure 
The USE consists of two parts (signified as I and II).

Part I contains tasks in which a student must give a short written answer. It's usually several letters or numbers.

Part II contains one or more tasks in which a student must use their creativity to complete them. Depending on the exam subject, a task can be a challenging mathematical exercise, an essay or a question to be answered argumentatively. Unlike part I, which is processed using computer, part II is evaluated by three experts (teachers of the exam subject) of the examination committee in a region where the exam takes place.

Paper forms

There are four stationary forms used in the course of each subject USE test: the registration form, answer sheet No. 1 (which is used to record answers for parts A and B), the primary answer sheet No. 2 (used to write answers for Part C), and the additional answer sheet No. 2 (handed out only if the primary sheet No. 2 gets filled up).

Rules for registration and filling the headers and answers in the forms of the USE are quite strict and are described in special instructions. Failure to adhere to the guidelines while filling out the forms may result in uncredited answers and void examinations.

Sources 

Higher education in Russia
School examinations
Standardized tests